Anushka Shrestha (born 18 December 1996) is a Nepalese beauty pageant title holder who was crowned Miss World Nepal 2019 on 9 May 2019. Shrestha also won Miss Nepal Oceania 2018. She was crowned by her predecessor Shrinkhala Khatiwada.

Early life and education
Shrestha was born on 18 January 1996 in Kathmandu, Nepal. Her mother, Mukta Shrestha, is a fashion designer who owns a boutique called Muku Boutique situated in Kupondole, Lalitpur. Shrestha completed her SLC from Triyog High School, and Junior College from Ace Higher Secondary School.

She went to Sydney, Australia and completed her Bachelor's degree in Commerce at the Australian Catholic University. 

Shrestha worked at the Commonwealth Bank of Australia.

Pageantry

Miss Nepal Oceania 2018 
In 2018, She competed in the Miss Nepal Oceania beauty pageant, held in Australia, and won the title. She gained entry into the Top 26 of Miss Nepal 2019 through winning the title.

Miss Nepal 2019 
The 25th edition of Miss Nepal 2019 was held at Laboratory H.S. premises, Kirtipur, Nepal on 9 May 2019. Twenty-five delegates competed for the national crown. Anushka Shrestha was crowned the new beauty queen. The new queen was crowned by Miss World 2018 Shrinkhala Khatiwada. She also won Miss Intellectual and Miss Fascino sub-titles during Miss Nepal 2019.

Miss World 2019 
She earned the title of Miss World Nepal 2019 and went on to represent Nepal in the Miss World 2019 beauty pageant, which was held in the ExCeL London, London, United Kingdom, on 14 December 2019. She won the Beauty With a Purpose sub-title, the Multimedia Award and her Head-to-Head Challenge. She ultimately placed in the Top 12 of Miss World 2019.

References

External links
Missnepal.com.np

Living people
1997 births
Miss Nepal winners
Nepalese beauty pageant winners
Miss World 2019 delegates
People from Kathmandu